Prisoner of Passion is an Italian film directed by Eriprando Visconti. The film was followed with the sequel Oedipus Orca.

Cast
Michele Placido: Michele
Rena Niehaus: Alice
Carmen Scarpitta: Irene, Alice's mother
Lisa Morpurgo: Elisa
Flavio Bucci: Gino
Bruno Corazzari: Paolo

Production
In reference to the scene in which Rena Niehaus has her vagina fingered explicitly by Michele Placido, the actress said she was not clear what the scene would be like because she couldn't speak Italian.

Reception
From a contemporary review, David Badder wrote in the Monthly Film Bulletin that the film was "slowly paced and directed with no commitment to character or theme, it is difficult to detect any compelling motive behind Prisoner of Passion." Badder continued that "the sex scenes remain wholly unerotic because their premise, that Alice uses her worldliness to overcome and then exploit the innocent peasant, is insufficiently defined."

References

Sources

External links

Prisoner of Passion at Variety Distribution

Italian crime thriller films
Films directed by Eriprando Visconti
1970s Italian films